Takis Synetopoulos (25 December 1948 – 30 November 2013) was a Greek footballer who played as a defender, and played with the Greece national football team.

Career
Synetopoulos played with Olympiacos Volos in 1963. In 1970, he played in the Alpha Ethniki with Olympiacos In his debut season he assisted Olympiacos in securing the 1970–71 Greek Football Cup. Throughout his tenure with Olympiacos he assisted in securing three consecutive league titles. He also assisted in winning the 1974–75 Greek Football Cup.

Synetopoulos featured in several European tournaments during his time with Olympiacos where he played in the 1972–73 UEFA Cup, 1976–77 UEFA Cup, 1978–79 UEFA Cup. He also played in the 1971–72 European Cup Winners' Cup, 1973–74 European Cup, and 1975–76 European Cup. In the summer of 1974 he played abroad in the National Soccer League with Toronto Homer. In 1979, he returned to his former club Olympiacos Volos, and later finished his career with PAS Lamia 1964.

He died on 30 November 2013.

International career
Synetopoulos played with the Greece national football team, and represented the team in 16 matches.

References

1948 births
2013 deaths
Association football defenders
Greek footballers
Olympiacos Volos F.C. players
Olympiacos F.C. players
PAS Lamia 1964 players
Super League Greece players
Canadian National Soccer League players
Greece international footballers
Footballers from Volos